Péter Gervai (born 7 January 1972) is a Hungarian IT development engineer, the founder of the Hungarian Wikipedia and the chair of Wikimedia Hungary. He was one of the pioneers of Internet culture in Hungary, as operator of the LifeForce BBS and the author of a snarky webpage about chain emails which was widely used to educate senders of such mail.

Personal life 
Péter Gervai is married and has two children. Besides his native Hungarian, he speaks fluently in English and German.

Career 
He graduated from Fazekas Mihály Gimnázium in 1990. Then he studied at Kandó Kálmán Műszaki Főiskola in Budapest. He worked at FidoNet as a moderator, and he was the maintainer of the LifeForce BBS, which was among the pioneers in Hungary. The starter of the Mozilla Open Directory's Hungarian part, He participated in several open source projects. He was elected as president of the newly formed "Hungarian Wikimedia Association" on 27 September 2008. He has a diverse interest mainly focused on technical areas, computers, mostly internet access and service providing, security, network design and programming, but he also likes reading and writing literature.

Milestones 
 1984–1999, BBS sysop, FidoNet node (and OtherNets nodes), moderator
 1993–1994, KKVMF, software engineer
 1994–1997, Budapest Bank, software engineer
 1994–1997, ExaBit Bt., Executive Director
 1996–          ObjectREXX course, (OS/2)
 1997–2005, Cory-Net Kft., Technical Director
 2004–2008, Council of Hungarian Internet Providers - a Member of the Presidency
 2008–          President of the Hungarian chapter of Wikimedia Foundation (Wikimédia Magyarország Egyesület)

Conferences 
 Hungarian Inventors' Day, Budapest, 2011, June 16. lecturer,
 Open Government Data Workshop, Budapest, 2011. May 20. (Friday, May 20, 2011 from 10:00 AM – 7:00 PM (GMT+0100))
 "Ten years of Wikipedia" conference, 2011, January 15, Buda Castle, National Széchényi Library

Interviews 
 Ígéretes magyar internetes lexikon, 2004. July 13.,
 Lelkesít a tudás átadása (A 168 óra interjúja Gervai Péterrel), 2005. December 15.,
 Eltűnik-e a könyv?, 2008. October 25., ITB-online,
 A komolyság világjátéka, Népszabadság, 2008. November 15.,
 Sokak szerint az is nevetséges, hogy van szócikk a sámánokról, 2010. December 20., 
 Az Omegával kezdődött a magyar Wikipédia, 2011. January 24., IT Cafe,
 Modernkori kódexmásoló, 2011. February 1., ITB-online,  
 Encyclopedia on the Net: The Wikipedia Story, 2011. March 13., 168 Óra Online,
 "Nem gondoltam volna, hogy ez lesz belőle" - a magyar Wikipédia alapítójának portréja, 2018. March 4., Business magazin, Budapest,

Publications 
 The Wikipedia, from idea to fame, Wikipédia, az ötlettől a hírnévig. 2006. May 29.

Awards 
 eFestival 2009 - Lifetime Achievement Award  of the Hungarian Association of Content Industry for the establishment of the Hungarian-language Wikipedia.

References

External links

 Peter Gervai 
  Peter Gervai on the Hungarian Wikimedia
 Hungarian Inventor's Day
 Hungarian Inventor's Day - video

1972 births
Living people
Engineers from Budapest
People from Debrecen